Saúl Basilio Coco-Bassey Oubiña (born 9 February 1999), better known as Saúl Coco, is a professional footballer who plays as a central defender or a defensive midfielder for Spanish club UD Las Palmas. Born in Spain, he represents the Equatorial Guinea national team.

Early life
Coco was born in Lanzarote, Canary Islands, to Basilio Coco-Bassey Eyanga and a Spanish mother. His father is an Equatoguinean former footballer and current coach who played for Canarian club CDU Puerto del Carmen in the 1987–88 season, alongside his brother Luis (Coco's uncle). Coco is also of Nigerian descent through his paternal grandfather.

Club career
Coco joined RCD Espanyol's youth setup in July 2016, after representing CD Orientación Marítima (where he was trained by his father) and UD Las Palmas. In August 2018, after finishing his formation, he was loaned to Tercera División side UA Horta for the season.

Coco made his senior debut on 18 August 2018, coming on as a second-half substitute in a 3–1 home win against UE Figueres. The following 18 July, he returned to his former club Las Palmas, being assigned to the C-team also in the fourth division.

Promoted to the reserves in Segunda División B ahead of the 2020–21 campaign, Coco made his first team debut on 17 December 2020, replacing Álvaro Lemos in a 4–0 away win against CD Varea, for the season's Copa del Rey. On 15 June 2022, he renewed his contract until 2025, being definitely promoted to the main squad.

International career
Eligible to play internationally for Equatorial Guinea, Nigeria or Spain, Coco was called up to the senior squad of the former in August 2017. He made his full international debut on 3 September, replacing Pablo Ganet in a 1–2 friendly loss to Benin; by doing so, he became the first person from Lanzarote to get called up internationally in 67 years. The match was subsequently eliminated from FIFA records, as the referee and his assistants referees were from Equatorial Guinea.

Coco became cap-tied to Equatorial Guinea on 17 November 2018, when he appeared in an Africa Cup of Nations qualifier match against Senegal.

International goals

Scores and results list Equatorial Guinea's goal tally first.

References

External links

1999 births
Living people
People from Lanzarote
Sportspeople from the Province of Las Palmas
Citizens of Equatorial Guinea through descent
Spanish sportspeople of Equatoguinean descent
Spanish people of Nigerian descent
Spanish sportspeople of African descent
Equatoguinean sportspeople of Spanish descent
Equatoguinean people of Nigerian descent
Sportspeople of Nigerian descent
Footballers from the Canary Islands
Equatoguinean footballers
Association football central defenders
Association football midfielders
Segunda División players
Segunda División B players
Tercera División players
RCD Espanyol B footballers
UA Horta players
UD Las Palmas C players
UD Las Palmas Atlético players
UD Las Palmas players
Equatorial Guinea international footballers
2021 Africa Cup of Nations players